Reginald Charles Pridmore III (born 15 July 1939) is an English former professional motorcycle road racing national champion. He is remembered for winning the inaugural AMA Superbike Championship in 1976, followed by 1977 and 1978. He is the father of retired AMA racer Jason Pridmore.

Early Days
Born in London, England, Pridmore began racing motorcycles in England in the early 1960s winning his first race at Silverstone. As a young man, he made the decision to sell all his possessions and move to the United States. He settled in Southern California and soon began competing in local motorcycle events, racing four-stroke production-based machines. In early 1970s he raced BMW R75/5 in production class and a F750 with a frame by Englishman Rob North in A.M.A. Nationals.

US Superbikes

In 1976, the A.M.A. introduced a new national championship for production-based bikes. Riding a BMW R90S sponsored by BMW's American importer, Butler & Smith, Pridmore impressed the motorcycling world by winning the national championship against more advanced Japanese machinery.

In 1977 he raced a Kawasaki Z1000 for the Racecrafters team with (the late) Pierre des Roches and Keith Code, claiming the first A.M.A. superbike championship for a Japanese manufacturer. Pridmore went on to win the A.M.A. Superbike Championship in 1978 riding for the Vetter team, again on a Pierre des Roches prepared Kawasaki. He was 39 years old when he won his final championship, making him the oldest A.M.A. Superbike champion. He retired after the 1979 season.

After racing

After his retirement from racing Pridmore established CLASS, one of the top motorcycle track-riding schools in the United States. In 2002, he was inducted into the AMA Motorcycle Hall of Fame.

Pridmore and his Ventura, California-based RPM Motorcycles shop attended several of the South Coast BMW Riders Club's Fiesta Rallies in the early 1980s. The photo shows Reg on a 1982 BMW R80G/S participating in the rally Slow Race.

He now lives in Santa Paula, CA where he owns a hangar at Santa Paula Airport KSZP. He keeps his motorcycles, a Scout airplane and a small hangar museum there.

References

External links
 Reg Pridmore Motorcycle School

1939 births
Living people
Sportspeople from London
People from Santa Paula, California
English motorcycle racers
AMA Superbike Championship riders
Motorcycle trainers